Anopina ednana is a moth of the family Tortricidae. It is found in eastern North America, including Maine, Massachusetts, New Hampshire, North Carolina, Ontario, Pennsylvania, Quebec, Tennessee and West Virginia.

The wingspan is 11–12 mm.

It was named in honour of the scientific illustrator Edna L. Beutenmüller.

References

Moths described in 1907
ednana
Moths of North America